Ripley's Believe It or Not! is a 2008 Philippine television informative show broadcast by GMA Network. The show is based on the early 2000s American series of the same name. Hosted by Chris Tiu, it premiered on August 18, 2008. The show concluded on September 22, 2010.

References

2008 Philippine television series debuts
2010 Philippine television series endings
Filipino-language television shows
GMA Network original programming
Philippine television series based on American television series
Philippine television shows
Ripley's Believe It or Not! television series